Anarchist from Colony is a 2017 South Korean biographical period drama film directed by Lee Joon-ik about the life of independence activist Park Yeol, with Lee Je-hoon taking on the titular role. It premiered in South Korea on June 28, 2017.

Synopsis 
The film is based on the true story of the anarchist and revolutionary Park Yeol (Lee Je-hoon), who organizes the anarchist group Heukdohoe, which planned to assassinate Japan's Crown Prince Hirohito during Japanese colonial rule of the Korean Peninsula. The movie also highlights the relationship between Park and his lover Fumiko Kaneko (Choi Hee-seo), a Japanese nihilist who sympathized with Koreans oppressed under Japanese rule.

Park Yeol is the leader of the anarchist group Bulryeongsa, which has 14 Korean and five Japanese members. He seems like an easygoing, courageous and disobedient young man who never troubles others. His partner Fumiko is a strong and intelligent woman who appears to be positive with a sense of humor, though she is imprisoned with her lover.

Plot 
The film shows the anarchist group Heukdohoe (which goes by multiple names) discussing their methods for resisting the Japanese harassment against Koreans. Park Yeol (Bak Yeol) as the leader of this group, plots a bombing against Prince Hirohito. Then, the Kanto Earthquake of 1923 hits Japan, leaving the city in ruin. In the film, Former Minister of Affairs Mizuno suggests that Koreans had been poisoning water wells and setting the city on fire following the earthquake. He promotes an idea that Japanese patriots go out and enact revenge; it is highly hinted at that he only wants this to enact revenge against Koreans following the March 1st Incident, where Korean anarchists made a rebellious stance against Japanese imperialism.

Following this, the Kanto Massacre occurs, where over 6000 Koreans were massacred by Japanese vigilantes. In order to cover up the massacre, Mizuno focusses on Yeol and his organization’s activities. Because they are self-proclaimed anarchists, he looks to trying them for crimes against Japan to minimize discussions about the massacre, eventually focusing on Yeol’s plot against Hirohito. The following trial highlights how Yeol and Kaneko made a mockery of the Japanese government and imperialist ways. They discuss their desire for the Japanese people to become disillusioned from the imperial family’s godly power over the nation. They note that in this way, equality between classes and peoples can occur; they also discuss how they are well aware their trial is meant to cover up the Korean Massacre and will do everything they can to prevent this. Underlying these beliefs are the intense moments of their companionship and love that center on their shared desire for revolution.

The film ends showing the guilty verdict Kaneko and Yeol faced, and how they narrowly avoided the death sentence. Once the two are separated, Kaneko mysteriously dies in prison from supposed suicide, though none of the Heukdohoe believe this—they fully believe she was murdered. They go to retrieve her body, and Yeol is said to have been released from prison after occupation ended in 1946. The final shot shows the film’s picture of Yeol and Kaneko and then the real one fading out to black.

Historiography 
The film made great efforts to match the story to the real Bak Yeol and Fumiko. Unfortunately, there is very little information about the two of them in the entire historiography of Korean Anarchism.

The Kanto Massacre that took the lives of over 6000 Koreans began from rumors the Hongō Komagome police heard about Koreans poisoning wells and starting fires. The inhumane deaths depicted in the film were based on real experiences by Korean and even some Japanese people. The trial of Yeol and Kaneko also came from a real need to cover up the massacre as well. The trial itself, with all the craze and sensational moments (like Yeol and Kaneko dressing in traditional Korean attire) is accurate as well. Ultimately, the two indeed faced the death penalty, representing Korean anarchism in its more nationalist sense.

Korean anarchism is largely understood as a reaction to the Japanese imperialism and anarchist ideas coming from Chinese and Japanese students. Korean anarchism always placed freedom from Japanese imperialism first. As nationalism influenced anarchism so did the ideology of socialist revolution creating a more equal world. Ultimately, social revolution became the ultimate goal of anarchism for Koreans, but it had to start with removing Japanese imperialism first. Yeol and Kaneko as portrayed in the film fit into this version of anarchism as they proclaim the ended to remove the imperial family’s pious hold over the Japanese people; in accomplishing this, then true social change can occur for all people. Their desire for anarchism rested on Korea becoming free from Japanese rule.

The film relays the story of two individual anarchists. In truth, these two in specific are only ever briefly mentioned in the entire historiography of Korean anarchism. The film’s focus on the love shared between the two and how it relates to their anarchism shows a commemoration to their memory. The very ending of the film, after discussing the aftermath of the trial for each anarchist, shows the real Kaneko and Yeol together. It insinuates that after everything, they are still together, and they ultimately won as the Japanese ended occupation in Korea. Thus, the film becomes a very historically accurate commemoration to these two. It memorializes them as heroes against Japanese oppression

Cast

Main
Lee Je-hoon as Park Yeol
Choi Hee-seo as Kaneko Fumiko

Supporting
Min Jin-woong as Hong Jin-yoo
Kwon Yul as Lee Seok 
Baek Soo-jang as Choi Young-hwan
Bae Je-gi as Choi Gyoo-jong
Kim In-woo as Mizuno Rentarō
Kim Jun-han as Datemas Kaisei
Tasuku Yamanouchi as Tatsuji Fuse
Wi Ha-joon as Korean youth in prison
Kim Sung-cheol as Fumio Koto.

Reception
The film topped the box office during its opening weekend, earning  with 817,971 admissions.

By the end of two weeks since the film was released, it has earned  in total.
 
The film earned a total of  after one month run.

The film was released in Los Angeles and Buena Park, California, also in Dallas, Texas in the United States.

Awards and nominations

See also
Kantō Massacre
Anarchism in Korea
Pak Yol
Fumiko Kaneko
March 1st Movement

References

External links

2017 films
2010s Korean-language films
Films directed by Lee Joon-ik
South Korean biographical drama films
South Korean political drama films
South Korean historical drama films
2017 biographical drama films
Films about anarchism
2010s political drama films
Films set in Korea under Japanese rule
Films set in the Taishō period
2010s South Korean films